Hercegović is a Bosnian surname and may refer to:

 Two sons of Stjepan Vukčić Kosača, a Bosnian duke and member of the Kosača noble family:
 Vladislav Hercegović (1426–1490), Duke of Saint Sava
 Stjepan Hercegović (1459–1517), Ottoman grand vizier (better known as Hersekzade Ahmed Pasha)

See also
 Herceg (title)